Edgar Mason Rudolph (May 23, 1934 – April 18, 2011) was an American professional golfer who won five times on the PGA Tour.

Early years and amateur career
Rudolph was born in Clarksville, Tennessee. He won the U.S. Junior Amateur in 1950. In 1956, he won the Western Amateur and the Tennessee State Open (as an amateur). He played on the 1957 Walker Cup team.

Professional career
Rudolph turned professional in 1958; he joined the PGA Tour in 1959 and was Rookie of the Year. He won five official PGA Tour events during his career. Rudolph also won the Tennessee State Open five times as a pro (1959, 1963, 1964, 1966, 1972). He played on the 1971 Ryder Cup team.

In December 1960, Rudolph took part in a controversial match against Sam Snead. Snead decided to deliberately lose the televised match during its final holes after he discovered he had too many golf clubs (more than 14) in his bag on the 12th hole of the match, which would have disqualified him in the match. After the match was over, Snead said he did not disqualify himself in order to not spoil the show.

Honors and awards
Rudolph was inducted as a charter member of the Tennessee Golf Hall of Fame in 1990. A 9-hole, regulation-length golf course in his hometown is named for him. A men's and a women's collegiate golf tournament also bears his name.

Professional wins (13)

PGA Tour wins (5)

PGA Tour playoff record (0–1)

Other wins (8)
1956 Tennessee Open (as an amateur)
1959 Tennessee Open
1962 Haig & Haig Scotch Foursome (with Kathy Whitworth)
1963 Tennessee Open
1964 Tennessee Open
1966 Tennessee Open
1969 Tennessee PGA Championship
1972 Tennessee Open

Results in major championships

Note: Rudolph never played in The Open Championship.

CUT = missed the half-way cut
"T" indicates a tie for a place

Summary

Most consecutive cuts made – 14 (1960 PGA – 1965 PGA)
Longest streak of top-10s – 2 (1964 PGA – 1965 Masters)

U.S. national team appearances
Amateur
Walker Cup: 1957 (winners)

Professional
Ryder Cup: 1971 (winners)

References

External links

American male golfers
Tennessee Volunteers men's golfers
PGA Tour golfers
PGA Tour Champions golfers
Ryder Cup competitors for the United States
Golfers from Tennessee
People from Clarksville, Tennessee
1934 births
2011 deaths